Neapolitan Carousel is a 1954 Italian comedy film directed by Ettore Giannini and starring Léonide Massine, Achille Millo and Agostino Salvietti. It was entered into the 1954 Cannes Film Festival, winning its International Prize. It was shot at the Cinecittà Studios in Rome and on location in Naples. The film's sets were designed by the art director Mario Chiari.

Cast
 Léonide Massine as Antonio 'Pulcinella' Petito
 Achille Millo as Pulcinella's son
 Agostino Salvietti as Prompter
 Clelia Matania as Donna Concetta
 Paolo Stoppa as Salvatore Esposito
 Maria Fiore as Donna Brigida
 Tina Pica as Capera
 Maria-Pia Casilio as Nannina
 Giacomo Rondinella as Luigino
 Sophia Loren as Sisina
 Dolores Palumbo as Sisina's mother
 Loris Gizzi as Erik Gustaffson
 Alberto Bonucci as Lyricist #1
 Vittorio Caprioli as Lyricist #2
 Carlo Mazzarella as Baron
 Vera Nandi as Lilì Kangy
 Yvette Chauviré as Margherita
 Folco Lulli as Don Raffaele
 Antonio Cifariello as Don Armando
 Nadia Gray as The beautiful beggar
 Tino Buazzelli as Capitan Spaccatrippa
 Enrico Viarisio as The Spanish tourist 
 Guglielmo Barnabò as The German tourist 
 Galeazzo Benti as The French tourist 
 Franco Coop as The English tourist

References

Bibliography 
 Chiti, Roberto & Poppi, Roberto. Dizionario del cinema italiano: Dal 1945 al 1959. Gremese Editore, 1991.

External links

1954 films
1950s historical comedy films
Italian historical comedy films
1950s Italian-language films
Films directed by Ettore Giannini
Films set in Naples
Films shot in Naples
Films shot at Cinecittà Studios
Films produced by Carlo Ponti
Lux Film films
1954 comedy films
1950s Italian films